Vasa Koilaniou is a village in the Limassol District of Cyprus, located 4 km south of Omodos.

References

Communities in Limassol District